Tim Fish (born 1970) is a comic book author and artist, known for the comics Cavalcade of Boys and its spin-off graphic novels, short stories for various anthologies and the original graphic novel Liebestrasse, which was nominated for both a Tripwire Award for Best Graphic Novel and a GLAAD Media Award for Outstanding Comic Book.

Early life
Fish was born in 1970 and attended the University of New Hampshire where he had a twice-weekly comic strip running in the college newspaper, The New Hampshire. Tim began drawing strip comics at a young age, eventually evolving to mini comics and graphic novels.

Career
Fish is known for his slice-of-life/romance print comic, Cavalcade of Boys, which has been released in trade paperback format, as well is its spin-off graphic novels. Comics by Fish appeared regularly in the Boston LGBT newspaper Bay Windows and in the Brazilian magazine DOM from 2007 to 2008.

Fish has contributed to several anthologies and adapted an excerpt of Emily Brontë's novel Wuthering Heights for Seven Stories Press. For Lionforge, he was an artist on an officially licensed comic series based on the NBC TV series Saved by the Bell from 2014 to 2015. In 2019, Comixology Originals published Liebestrasse the graphic novel he co-created with Greg Lockard.

Personal life
Fish, who is openly gay, has lived in St. Louis, and San Diego.

Works

Books
 Baby Makes Three, Poison Press/Comixology, 2021, 
 Boys in Love, H&O Éditions, 2006, 
 Cavalcade of Boys, Poison Press, 2006 
 Liebestrasse, Comixology Originals, 2019
 Love Is the Reason, Poison Press, 2008 
 Something Fishy This Way Comes, Poison Press, 2006 
 Strugglers, Poison Press, 2006 
 Trust/Truth, Poison Press, 2009 
 Saved by the Bell: Freshman Year, Roar (Lionforge Press), 2016

Anthologies
 On the Romance Road, Poison Press/Comixology, 2021
 Young Bottoms in Love, Poison Press, 2007

Contributions
 The Book of Boy Trouble 2: Born to Trouble, edited by Robert Kirby and David Kelly, Green Candy Press, 2008 
 Boy Trouble, edited by Robert Kirby and David Kelly, Boy Trouble Press, 2004 
 Happy Boys and Girls, Coniglio Editore, 2006 
 Inbound #4, edited by Dave Kender, Dan Mazur, and Shelli Paroline, Boston Comics Roundtable, 2009 ASIN B00377AK58
 Nation X, Marvel Comics, 2010 
 Iron Man: Titanium, Marvel Comics, 2010
 Hopeless Savages Greatest Hits, volume 1, Oni Press, 2010 
 The Graphic Canon, volume 2, Seven Stories Press, 2012 
 No Straight Lines, Fantagraphics, 2013 
 Strange Sport Stories, Vertigo, 2015 
 Where We Live: Las Vegas Shooting Benefit Anthology, Image Comics, 2018

References

External links 
 
 

American comics artists
American comics writers
American gay artists
LGBT comics creators
LGBT people from New Hampshire
1970 births
Living people